The Hetch Hetchy to Lake Vernon Trail in Yosemite starts from the parking lot close to the O'Shaughnessy Dam at the Hetch Hetchy Reservoir, and goes to Lake Vernon through the Yosemite Wilderness. Staying overnight requires a wilderness permit which can be obtained at the Hetch Hetchy ranger station or reserved online.

Trail Data
 Total distance: 23 miles (11.5 miles one way)
 Elevation gain: 
 Climbing elevation: 4707 feet (3723 feet on the way in,  on the way out)

External links
 Trails in the Hetch Hetchy vicinity from the National Park Service web site

Sierra Nevada (United States)
Hiking trails in California
Protected areas of Tuolumne County, California
Yosemite National Park